Jhansi Rani is a 1988 Telugu-language thriller film, produced by Midde Rama Rao under the Sri Rajyalakshmi Art Pictures banner and directed by Satyanand. It stars Rajendra Prasad, Bhanupriya  and music composed by Chakravarthy. The film is based on Malladi Venkata Krishna Murthy's novel Mr. V.

Plot
Jhansi Rani is a daring and dashing woman who always fights against anti-social issues in society. She is in love with an Advocate Dinakar (Daggupati Raja). Once, Jhansi got attacked by some goons and she is protected by a medical representative Sriraj (Rajendra Prasad), both of them become good friends. Jhansi's sister Sampoorna (Rajyalakshmi), a handicapped woman, marries an unknown person Viswanath, who dies within two days of marriage. Due to a weather problem, Jhansi not able to attend the marriage and does not see his face. After some time, Neelakantham (Kota Srinivasa Rao), a CBCID officer meets Jhansi and explains the case of Mr. V, a person who keep names starting with V and cheats the girls after marrying them and runs away with the dowry, proving that he has died. Surprisingly, he reveals that the person who has married Sampoorna is also Mr. V. Knowing this, Sampoorna commits suicide. Now Jhansi takes an oath to catch Mr. V under any circumstances with the help of Sriraj. The rest of the story is about the identity of Mr. V. and how is he caught?

Cast

Rajendra Prasad as Sriraj
Bhanupriya as Jhansi Rani
Daggupati Raja as Dinakar
Jaggayya as Advocate Jadish Chandra 
Kanta Rao as Jhansi's uncle
Suthi Veerabhadra Rao as Velu's uncle
Suthi Velu as Constable Velu
Subhalekha Sudhakar as Chanti
Kota Srinivasa Rao as Neelakantham
Ali as Nani
P. J. Sarma as Advocate Jaganatham
Sakshi Ranga Rao as Garudachalam
Benerjee as Raju
Balaji as Pratap Kumar
Hema Sundar as Judge
Potti Prasad
KK Sarma as Durvasa Murthy
Annapurna as Lakshmi
Poornima as Radha
Rajyalakshmi as Sampoorna
Mucherla Aruna as Selvarani
Radha Kumari as Selvarani's mother
Srilakshmi as Velu's wife

Soundtrack

Music composed by Chakravarthy. Lyrics were written by Veturi. Music released on AVM Audio Company.

Other
 VCDs and DVDs on - SHALIMAR Video Company, Hyderabad

References

Indian drama films
Films based on Indian novels
Films scored by K. Chakravarthy
1980s Telugu-language films